Hollywood Cowboy is a 1937 American adventure film directed by Ewing Scott and written by Daniel Jarrett and Ewing Scott. The film stars George O'Brien, Cecilia Parker, Maude Eburne, Joe Caits and Frank Milan. The film was released on May 28, 1937, by RKO Pictures.

The film was rereleased in 1947 by Motion Picture Ventures as Wings Over Wyoming.

Plot
Hollywood Western star Jeffery Carson and his sidekick Shakespeare have just recently completed outdoor shooting on a film and decide to remain in the area to do some recreational hunting. In the meantime a crime syndicate led by Doc Kramer has come up with a new scheme to make money. With a range war going on, the criminals ramp up conflict between the two sides, including murder. They form a bogus cattleman association that is actually a protection racket where ranchers will a pay a penny a pound on their cattle.

Carson and Shakespeare save the life of ranch owner Joyce Butler when gangsters rip her fence down and threaten her. Keeping their identities secret, Carson and Shakespeare sign on as ranch hands for Joyce and her mother Violet Butler. When Violet spurns Kramer's protection offer, the gangsters bomb the Butler's herd from an airplane.

Cast 
 George O'Brien as Jeffery Carson
 Cecilia Parker as Joyce Butler
 Maude Eburne as Violet Butler
 Joe Caits as G. Gatsby (Shakespeare) Holmes
 Frank Milan as Westbrook Courtney
 Charles Middleton as "Doc" Kramer
 Lee Shumway as Benson
 Walter De Palma as Rolfe Metzger
 Al Hill as Henchman Camby
 William Royle as Klinker
 Al Herman as Henchman Steger
 Frank Hagney as Gillie
 Dan Wolheim as Morey
 Slim Balch as Ranch hand Slim
 Sid Jordan as Ranch hand Morgan
 Lester Dorr as Joe Garvey
 Harold Daniels as Hotel Clerk

References

External links 
 
 
 
 

1937 films
American black-and-white films
American Western (genre) films
1937 Western (genre) films
RKO Pictures films
American aviation films
American crime films
1930s English-language films
Films directed by Ewing Scott
1930s American films